On Murder Considered as One of the Fine Arts (French: De l'assassinat considéré comme un des beaux-arts) is a 1964 French film directed by Maurice Boutel. It was not cinematically released. It takes its name from Thomas De Quincey's essay On Murder Considered as one of the Fine Arts.

Cast
 Béatrice Altariba 
 Edmond Ardisson 
 Zisca Baum 
 Rod Calvert 
 Léonce Corne 
 Bernard Dhéran as Président des rédempteurs de l'assassinat  
 Colin Drake 
 Robert Favart 
 Grégoire Gromoff 
 Jean Horwath 
 Jacqueline Huet as Lady Manton  
 Charles Moulin 
 Virginia Rodin 
 Anthony Stuart as Président des gentlemen amateurs  
 Howard Vernon

References

Bibliography 
 Philippe Rège. Encyclopedia of French Film Directors, Volume 1. Scarecrow Press, 2009.

External links 
 

1964 films
French drama films
1960s French-language films
Films directed by Maurice Boutel
1960s French films